Takehiko Yanagi (born 28 March 1916) was a Japanese field hockey player. He competed in the men's tournament at the 1936 Summer Olympics.

References

External links
 

1916 births
Japanese male field hockey players
Olympic field hockey players of Japan
Field hockey players at the 1936 Summer Olympics
Place of birth missing